The Hoosier Helmet Trophy is the name of the rivalry trophy between the Butler Bulldogs and Valparaiso Beacons.

History
Both schools are members of the Pioneer Football League. Butler and Valparaiso first played in 1927, and have played each other in football every year since 1951. The two teams have met 81 times on the football field, with Butler currently holding a 51–30 edge in the all-time series. In 2006, at the suggestion of Butler head coach Jeff Voris, the Hoosier Helmet Trophy was created to commemorate and intensify the long-standing rivalry between the two schools.

The trophy is a white football helmet with Butler's logo on one side, and Valparaiso's logo on the other; mounted on a hardwood plaque. An inscription is added to the base each year with the winner and the score of each game. Since the trophy was established in 2006, Butler leads in the trophy series, 11–7.

Game results

Source:

See also
 List of NCAA college football rivalry games

References

College football rivalry trophies in the United States
Butler Bulldogs football
Valparaiso Beacons football